Babilon refers to the following places in Poland:

 Babilon, Masovian Voivodeship
 Babilon, Pomeranian Voivodeship